"Fu-Gee-La" is a song by American hip-hop trio, Fugees, released on December 13, 1995, as the lead single from their second and final album, The Score (1996). Produced by Salaam Remi, it contains a sample of "If Loving You Is Wrong (I Don't Want to Be Right)" by Ramsey Lewis, while its chorus contains an interpolation of "Ooo La La La" by Teena Marie. Immediately following this is a sample of "Shakiyla (JRH)" by the Poor Righteous Teachers.

Several remixes of the song, including the "Refugee Camp Remix" and the "Sly & Robbie Remix", which features a young Akon, also appear on The Score. The song peaked at number 29 on the Billboard Hot 100 chart, the Fugees' highest position on the chart, and peaked at #1 on the Billboard Dance chart. "Fu-Gee-La" has been certified platinum by the RIAA. In 2016, the Weeknd sampled it on the song "Sidewalks"(featuring Kendrick Lamar), additionally Jay-Z sampled it on his song "Moonlight" on his 4:44 album. Trey Songz also interpolates the song on his single "Na Na".

Background
Producer Salaam Remi discussed the song's conception: "We actually were working on a song for Spike Lee’s Clockers movie that actually, that song never came out. So we had a song that we did for Clockers, and then during that session, Wyclef was like, 'Yo, play that beat you did for Fat Joe!' And Lauryn was like, 'Yo, play the Fat Joe beat' and then when I played it, Clef jumped up and spit the first verse to 'Fu-Gee-La.' He had the verse, but it just fell all together and then we worked on it. That song was actually done prior to The Score, so a lot of The Score’s vibe was based around what that song was."

Critical reception
Larry Flick from Billboard stated that "Fu-Gee-La" "delivers the dope and then some: The Fugees' trademark tight, creative lyrics find a perfect home in the recycled hook from Teena Marie's 1988 No. 1 R&B hit, "Ooo La La La"." He added that it "should be a no-brainer for urban programmers". Michael Hill from Cash Box picked it as one of the "memorable tracks" of The Score album. David Fricke from Rolling Stone complimented "the sweet heat of Lauryn Hill's alto".

Music video
The accompanying music video for "Fu-Gee-La" was filmed in Jamaica. The Fugees wanted to recreate Jimmy Cliff's film The Harder They Come (1972). It follows a robbery-related concept, with each band member taking on a particular role.

Track listing
 UK CD1
 "Fu-Gee-La" (Album Version) – 4:15
 "Fu-Gee-La" (North Side Mix) – 4:15
 "Fu-Gee-La" (Refugee Camp Remix) – 4:24
 "Fu-Gee-La" (Sly & Robbie Mix) – 5:33
 "Fu-Gee-La" (Wyclef's Global Acoustic Mix) – 4:18
 "Fu-Gee-La" (Fugi Acapella) – 4:08

 UK CD2
 "Fu-Gee-La" (Album Version) – 4:15
 "Fu-Gee-La" (Album Instrumental) – 4:15
 "Fu-Gee-La" (Refugee Camp Remix) – 4:24
 "Fu-Gee-La" (Refugee Camp Instrumental) – 4:22
 "Fu-Gee-La" (North Side Mix) – 4:15
 "Fu-Gee-La" (Sly & Robbie Mix) – 5:33
 "How Many Mics" – 4:22

Charts

Weekly charts

Year-end charts

Certifications

References

External links
 

1996 singles
Fugees songs
Songs written by Wyclef Jean
Songs written by Lauryn Hill
Songs written by Salaam Remi
Song recordings produced by Salaam Remi
Hip hop soul songs
1996 songs
Ruffhouse Records singles